Harry Barnes may refer to:

 Harry Barnes (baseball) (1915–1993), American Negro league baseball player
 Harry Barnes (basketball) (born 1945), American basketball player
 Harry Barnes (footballer) (1903–2001), Australian rules footballer
 Harry Barnes (Labour politician) (born 1936), British Labour Party MP for North East Derbyshire, 1987–2005
 Harry Barnes (Liberal politician) (1870–1935), British Liberal Party MP for Newcastle upon Tyne East, 1918–1922
 Harry Elmer Barnes (1889–1968), American historian
 Harry F. Barnes (1932–2019), U.S. federal judge
 Harry G. Barnes Jr. (1926–2012), American diplomat, United States Ambassador to India

See also
 Henry Barnes (disambiguation)